Nowa Wieś  is a village in the administrative district of Gmina Kutno, within Kutno County, Łódź Voivodeship, in central Poland.

The village has an approximate population of 150.

In Nowa Wieś is located the exact geodetic center of Poland - a centroid of the entire territory of Poland. Its coordinates are 52°11'27.95" N and 19°21'19.46" E.

References

Villages in Kutno County